Ceratophyllus fionnus is a species of flea in the family Ceratophyllidae. It was described by Usher in 1968.

References 

Ceratophyllidae
Insects described in 1968